The Chaparral 2K is an open-wheel racing car chassis, designed and built by Lola Cars that competed in the CART open-wheel racing series, for competition in the 1979 IndyCar season, and competed until 1981. It famously won the 1980 Indianapolis 500, being driven by Johnny Rutherford.

References 

Open wheel racing cars
American Championship racing cars